Jonathan Mark Shiff is an Australian television producer of television series. After leaving his work as a lawyer, he founded his Melbourne-based production company, Jonathan M. Shiff Productions, in 1988. His company produces programs for children and families, which are screened in 170 countries. He is regarded in the industry as being known for discovering Australian talent who go on to successful international careers, such as Margot Robbie, Liam Hemsworth, Claire Holt, and Phoebe Tonkin.

Notable projects 
Shiff is best known for producing the Ocean Girl series, the H2O: Just Add Water series and spinoff Mako Mermaids, which stream on Netflix. Shiff also produced the television series The Bureau of Magical Things.

Upcoming projects
While his professional homepage hints that a movie of 90 minutes length has been produced for Mako Mermaids, the B2B-site that ZDF Enterprises — distributor of the H2O franchise — operates for said show, shows no sign of such movie produced.

Shiff also hinted the Movie on social media.

Filmography

Television

References

External links

 
 
 
 
 

AACTA Award winners
Australian television producers
Living people
Year of birth missing (living people)
Australian people of Dutch descent